Western Warriors Soccer Club is a football club based in Nassau, Bahamas. They play in the BFA Senior League.

Achievements
BFA Senior League: 2
 2014/15, 2016/17

New Providence FA Cup: 2
 2014/15, 2015/16

References

External links

Football clubs in the Bahamas